Tornado is an EP by Canadian punk rock band Teenage Heads, released in 1983. It was the band's first release on MCA and their first international release outside of Canada. Normally called Teenage Head, MCA convinced the band to change their name on this release to a pluralized form to avoid possible censorship and also encouraged a more polished, mainstream sound

Track listing

Personnel 
Frankie Venom (Kerr) - vocals
Gordon Lewis - electric guitar
Steve Marshall - bass
Nick Stipanitz - drums, vocals
David Bendeth - producer
Ed Stone - engineer
Recorded at Metalworks, Mississauga, Ontario, Canada

Charts

Album

Singles

References 

1983 EPs
Teenage Head (band) albums